13 Pashons - Coptic calendar - 15 Pashons

Fixed commemorations
All fixed commemorations below are observed on 14 Pashons (22 May) by the Coptic Orthodox Church.

Saints
Saint Pachomius the Great (64 A.M.), (348 A.D.)
Saint Epimachus of Pelusium

References
Coptic Synexarion

Days of the Coptic calendar